Casper's First Christmas is a 1979 animated Christmas television special and crossover produced by Hanna-Barbera. It features Casper the Friendly Ghost and his friend Hairy Scarey from the animated series Casper and the Angels. The special features guest stars Yogi Bear, Boo-Boo, Huckleberry Hound, Snagglepuss, Quick Draw McGraw, and Augie Doggie and Doggie Daddy. It aired on NBC on December 18, 1979.

The theme song, "Comin' Up Christmas Time," sung by Yogi's pals was used again a year later in Yogi's First Christmas, depicting a different premise in which Yogi and Boo Boo (who, being bears are supposed to be hibernating in the winter) can be seen celebrating Christmas with the other cast members. "Comin' Up Christmas Time" was released on Hanna-Barbera's Christmas Sing-A-Long album on CD and cassette in 1991 and is currently on various streaming services.

This also marked the first and only time that this special pairs together the characters from its owners, Hanna-Barbera and Harvey Entertainment. Like many animated series created by Hanna-Barbera in the 1970s, the show contained a laugh track created by the studio.

Network Ten aired the special in Australia.

Plot
Casper and his friend Hairy Scary are in a house about to be demolished on Christmas Eve and go out to look for a new place to move to after Christmas in California. Then Yogi and his friends get lost and arrive at Casper and Hairy's house and clean and decorate it to celebrate Christmas. Then Casper befriends Yogi and company only for Hairy to try to ruin the party with Casper and his new friends. Then Hairy has a change of heart and celebrates Christmas with Casper and his new friends and ending with Santa Claus saving the house and turning it into Hairy's Haunting Lodge.

Cast
 Julie McWhirter as Casper The Friendly Ghost
 Daws Butler as Yogi Bear / Huckleberry Hound / Quick Draw McGraw / Snagglepuss / Augie Doggie
 Don Messick as Boo-Boo Bear
 Hal Smith as Santa Claus
 John Stephenson as Hairy Scary The Ghost / Doggie Daddy
 Paul DeKorte as Singer
 Ida Sue McCune as Singer 
 Michael Redman as Singer

Home media
Turner Home Entertainment released Casper's First Christmas on VHS on September 26, 1995. On July 31, 2012, Warner Bros. released Hanna-Barbera Christmas Classics Collection on DVD in region 1 via their Warner Archive Collection; this was a Manufacture-on-Demand (MOD) release, available exclusively through Warner's online store and only in the US. This collection features a trilogy of Christmas specials: Casper's First Christmas, The Town That Santa Forgot and A Christmas Story.

VHS release dates 
 December 4, 1986 (Worldvision Home Video)
 December 3, 1987 (Worldvision Home Video/Kids Klassics Home Video)
 September 26, 1995 (Turner Home Entertainment)
 September 29, 1998 (Warner Home Video)
 November 2, 1999 (Warner Home Video)
 October 31, 2000 (Warner Home Video)
 October 16, 2001 (Warner Home Video)

DVD release date
July 31, 2012 (Warner Home Video/Warner Archive)

See also
 Casper's Halloween Special
 Casper and the Angels

References

External links
 
Casper's First Christmas at The Big Cartoon DataBase

1979 television specials
1970s American television specials
1970s animated television specials
Animated crossover television specials
Harvey Comics series and characters
Hanna-Barbera television specials
NBC television specials
Yogi Bear films
Huckleberry Hound specials
Ghosts in television
Casper the Friendly Ghost films
Yogi Bear television specials
Hanna-Barbera animated films
American Christmas television specials
Animated Christmas television specials
Santa Claus in television
Films directed by Carl Urbano